Gin Branch is a stream in Hickman and Maury counties, Tennessee, in the United States.

Gin Branch was named from the presence of a cotton gin in the 1820s.

See also
List of rivers of Tennessee

References

Rivers of Hickman County, Tennessee
Rivers of Maury County, Tennessee
Rivers of Tennessee